The term habano (Spanish for "from Havana") most often refers to Cuban cigars. It may also refer to:

Cigar companies 
Habanos S.A.

See also
Habanero (disambiguation)
Habanera (disambiguation)

Demonyms